Dellwood, Wisconsin may refer to:
Dellwood, Adams County, Wisconsin, an unincorporated community in Adams County, Wisconsin
Dellwood, Sauk County, Wisconsin, an unincorporated community in Sauk County, Wisconsin